In biology, robustness is used to describe a taxon with a stronger and heavier build (morphology) when compared to a related gracile taxon. The terms are used in contrast to one another. The term is used by physical anthropologists and paleoanthropologists to refer to a big-boned and muscular body.

For example, members of the genus Sapajus have robust body types and are called the robust capuchin monkeys while members of the genus Cebus have gracile body types and are called the gracile capuchin monkeys. Male and female members of the same species may display sexual dimorphism and have robust and gracile morphologies.

The terms "robust" vs. "gracile" are used in the context of human evolution, to distinguish:
"robust" vs. "gracile" australopithecines, see Paranthropus
"robust" archaic humans vs. "gracile" anatomically modern humans
"robust" early modern humans  (Cro-Magnon) vs. "gracile" Epipaleolithic humans (Combe-Capelle)

References

Animal anatomy
Morphology (biology)